Walter Kåre Tjønndal (22 January 1923 – 23 March 2014) was a Norwegian politician for the Labour Party.

Tjønndal was born in January 1923 in Borge. 

He was elected to the Norwegian Parliament from Nordland in 1969, but was not re-elected in 1973. On the local level he was a member of Hol municipality council from 1955 to 1963, serving the last four years as mayor. He then became mayor of its successor municipality Vestvågøy from 1963 to 1967. He chaired the municipal party chapter from 1963 to 1964.

Outside politics he worked in agriculture.

References

External links 

1923 births
2014 deaths
Members of the Storting
Labour Party (Norway) politicians
Mayors of places in Nordland
20th-century Norwegian politicians